Adam Edward Coffey (born 1964) is an American businessman and author.

Career
Coffey was born in Illinois in 1964 and grew up in Michigan, United States. His father was a lieutenant in the U.S. Navy. After completing his high school education, Coffey enlisted as a soldier in the U.S. Army obtaining the rank of Sergeant. During his brief military career 1982 to 1986, Coffey served as a journeyman engineer, and repaired classified advanced air defense AN/MPQ-49 Forward Area Alerting Radars.

After returning to civilian life, he joined General Electric's healthcare division, first as an engineer, later as an executive. Coffey joined Masterplan in 2001, as President and COO, then Wash Multifamily Laundry Services, a laundry services company, and became its chief executive officer (CEO) from 2003 until 2016. From 2016 to 2021, Coffey served as the head of CoolSys. 

In February 2019, he published his debut book, The Private Equity Playbook, which was later reviewed by Kirkus Reviews in March 2019.

In September 2021, his second book, The Exit Strategy Playbook, was published. It was also reviewed by Kirkus Reviews. In the same year, he was included in OC 500 list.

Coffey founded The CEO Advisory Guru LLC in 2021.

Books 
 Coffey, Adam E. (February 2019). The Private Equity Playbook
 Coffey, Adam E. (September 2021). The Exit Strategy Playbook

References 

Living people

1964 births
21st-century American writers
21st-century American businesspeople
General Electric people